The transport system in Scotland is generally well-developed. The Scottish Parliament has control over most elements of transport policy within Scotland, with the Cabinet Secretary for Transport, Infrastructure and Connectivity holding portfolio responsibility within the Scottish Government. Transport Scotland is the Executive Agency responsible for the Scottish transport network.

Some aspects of transport policy and administration are reserved (i.e., not devolved), and are therefore the responsibility of the UK Government's Department for Transport:
Driving and vehicle certification
Legislation regulating Air transport
Some legislation regulating Marine transport and Navigation (including most aspects of merchant shipping)
Cross-border rail services (although the franchising of the Caledonian Sleeper is devolved)
Operation of the Great Britain road numbering scheme
Transport of radioactive material

Railways 

Scotland has an extensive railway network, with links across the country, connections to England, local commuter links to the major cities (many of which were electrified under British Rail) and freight.

The railway network is owned by Network Rail, which is responsible for the majority of the railway infrastructure. Rail services are provided under franchises awarded by the government. The current holder of the Scottish franchise is ScotRail Trains Intercity services are also operated by Avanti West Coast, CrossCountry, Caledonian Sleeper, London North Eastern Railway and TransPennine Express.

On 1 January 2006, Transport Scotland was established, which would oversee the regulation of railways in Scotland and administer major rail projects.
Since April 2022, Transport Scotland has taken ScotRail back into public ownership via its operator of last resort, Scottish Rail Holdings. It will do the same with the Caledonian Sleeper service in June 2023.

Cross border services

The main cross border services in Scotland are:
 The West Coast Main Line – operated by Avanti West Coast and TransPennine Express
 Services from Edinburgh Waverley, Glasgow Central) and Motherwell to Manchester Airport, Birmingham New Street and London Euston
 East Coast Main Line – operated by London North Eastern Railway
 Services from Inverness, Aberdeen, Glasgow Central and Edinburgh Waverley to London King's Cross
 Cross Country Route – operated by CrossCountry
 Services from Aberdeen, Dundee, Glasgow Central and Edinburgh Waverley to Leeds, Sheffield, Derby, Birmingham New Street, Bristol Temple Meads, Exeter St Davids, Plymouth and Penzance
 Caledonian Sleeper – overnight sleeper services
 Services from Inverness, Aberdeen, Fort William, Glasgow Central and Edinburgh Waverley to London Euston
 Glasgow South Western Line – operated by ScotRail Trains
 Services linking Carlisle, Dumfries, Kilmarnock, Glasgow Central, Paisley, Troon (for P&O Ferries to Larne), Ayr and Stranraer (with links by bus from the two latter stations to Cairnryan, for P&O Ferries to Larne or Stena Line to Belfast).

Scottish services

Within Scotland, 94% of passenger service trains are operated by ScotRail, with the remaining 6% being cross border. Until 2005, services within the former Strathclyde Regional Council area were provided by First ScotRail on behalf of SPT.

History
The first railway in Scotland was the Monkland and Kirkintilloch Railway, opened in 1826. The first passenger railway was the Kilmarnock and Troon Railway. The first railways in Scotland were operated using horse traction. By 1850, Scotland's major cities were linked to each other and to the rest of the British railway network. The second half of the nineteenth century saw a rapid expansion of the network, and by 1900; virtually every town with a population greater than 2,000 on the Scottish mainland had a railway station. At the same time, trains became more comfortable, faster and more frequent whilst the cost of travel declined relative to wages.

Nevertheless, there were probably never more than 100 million or so journeys made per year within Scotland, little more than 20 per head of population, illustrating how most people had little need, financial means or desire to travel long distances. Railways did, though, play an important part in moving freight, especially heavy loads such as coal, iron and steel, and played a vital role in the First World War.

After World War I, the Railways Act 1921 also known as the Grouping Act, merged the Caledonian Railway and its rival, the North British Railway into the newly created London, Midland and Scottish Railway and London and North Eastern Railway companies.

After World War II, the railways were nationalised by the Transport Act 1947 into British Railways. The Scottish network was reorganised as the Scottish Region (ScR), one of six new regions of British Railways.

By the late-1950s, the railways were operating at a loss. In 1963, the Government appointed Dr. Richard Beeching as Chairman of the British Transport Commission. He commissioned a report called The Reshaping of British Railways also known as the Beeching Report that intended to reorganise the railways to become more profitable. This led to the infamous Beeching cuts, resulting in 650 miles of track and associated stations being closed. The closures were deeply unpopular by many people affected and resulted in protests, most notably the Waverley Route.

The closure programme slowed down after the Transport Act 1968 made it possible for the Government to directly subsidise loss-making lines and the last major closures in the 1970s, were the direct Edinburgh–Perth Glenfarg line and the Formartine and Buchan Railway which connected Peterhead and Fraserburgh to Aberdeen.

In the 1980s, British Railways (by that point renamed "British Rail") rebranded the Scottish Region as ScotRail.

British Rail was privatised in March 1997 by the outgoing Conservative Government. The Scotland franchise was won by National Express who decided to retain the ScotRail brand and operated the franchise until 2004. The Scotland franchise was then operated by First ScotRail until 2015 when Abellio ScotRail was awarded the franchise by the devolved Scottish Government. The Caledonian Sleeper service, which had previously been operated by the Scotland franchise holder from 1997, was separated as a new franchise in 2015. It is currently operated by Serco.

Since 1997, rail usage has risen, which has resulted in the reopening of former railway lines and stations closed under the Beeching Axe. Major reopenings include:
 Airdrie–Bathgate rail link – reopened a fourth link between Edinburgh and Glasgow.
 Stirling–Alloa–Kincardine rail link - reconnected Clackmannanshire to the rail network.
 Borders Railway – partial reopening of the Waverley Route
In 2008, the Scottish Government announced that £200 million would be spent to reduce journey times between Aberdeen and both Edinburgh and Glasgow. The funds would shorten the journey time between Aberdeen and Edinburgh by 24 minutes. However, in 2021, it was stated that only £1.68 million had been spent.

Glasgow Subway
The Glasgow Subway is the only underground system in Scotland. It opened on 14 December 1896, making it the third-oldest underground network in the world after the Budapest Metro and the London Underground. It is owned and operated by Strathclyde Partnership for Transport.

Trams and light rail

Edinburgh Trams opened on 31 May 2014. It is the only system currently in operation in Scotland, although Aberdeen, Dundee, Dunfermline, Edinburgh and Glasgow formerly had extensive networks.

Road

Scotland has an extensive road network throughout the country. The motorway network is concentrated in the Central belt, with trunk roads (A roads) connecting the rest of the country.

Major routes in Scotland include:
 The M74 motorway and A74(M) motorway between Glasgow and the M6 at Carlisle
 The M77 motorway/A77 road between Glasgow, Kilmarnock, Ayr and Stranraer
 The M9 motorway between Edinburgh and Bridge of Allan
 The M8 motorway between Edinburgh, Glasgow and Greenock
 The M80 motorway between Glasgow and Stirling
 The M90 motorway between Edinburgh, Kinross and Perth
 The A1 road between Edinburgh, Musselburgh, Haddington, Dunbar, Berwick and London
 The A82 road between Glasgow, Crianlarich, Fort William and Inverness via Loch Lomond and The Trossachs and Loch Ness
 The A9 road between Falkirk, Stirling, Perth, Pitlochry, Aviemore, Inverness, Golspie, Thurso and Scrabster ferry terminal, (connecting to the NorthLink Ferries ferry to Stromness, Orkney) via The Cairngorms
 The A90 road between Edinburgh, Perth, Dundee, Forfar, Stonehaven, Aberdeen, Peterhead and Fraserburgh

Traffic 

Within the large cities, roads become congested in peak hours. The M8 and M77 motorways become heavily congested in peak hours, especially around Glasgow where it travels through the heart of the city. The main congestion hotspots are in Glasgow City Centre around the Kingston Bridge where a large amount of traffic leaves and enter the road. Also further down the road traffic joining at Hillington Estate and Braehead Shopping Centre near Glasgow Airport can cause hold-ups. Traffic is also extremely heavy between Glasgow and Edinburgh at all times, however rarely comes to a standstill.

Road construction 

An extension to the M9 spur to link with the A90 at the Forth Bridge recently opened, as did the new Clackmannanshire Bridge over the Firth of Forth. A controversial extension to the M74 motorway through the southside of Glasgow was also completed in 2011. The road, first proposed in the 1960s, was due to be open in 2008 however legal action against the road was brought by environmental group Friends of the Earth. The action ultimately failed; however, the motorway has widespread opposition after ministers over-ruled the Local Public Inquiry held into the project which recommended that the road not be built, as it would be unable to substantially reduce congestion and would lead to more vehicles and pollution in the area. The Scottish Ministers voted for the road, believing that it will regenerate the inner city of Glasgow's Southside and bring economic benefits to Renfrewshire, Inverclyde and the Southside of Glasgow. Construction cost is estimated at £575 million, and it is Scotland's biggest roads project, and the first motorway to be built in a British urban area for decades.

Buses 

Scotland is covered by a large bus network throughout many towns, cities and rural areas. It is estimated that 95% of the population live within 5 minutes walk of a bus stop. National and international buses often operate out of main bus stations in the cities, such as Buchanan bus station in Glasgow and Edinburgh bus station.

Scottish Citylink and Megabus are the two principal long-distance coach operators within Scotland, and currently operating together as a joint venture, however the deal is being monitored by the competition commission to ensure that it does not unfairly damage long-distance bus travel in Scotland. National Express provide coach links with cities in England and Wales.

FirstGroup and Stagecoach Group are two large public transport companies which are based in Scotland at Aberdeen and Perth respectively, and both operate a number of local and regional services.

Numerous local independent operators also run bus services throughout Scotland as well as Lothian Buses, Edinburgh's largest bus operator and Scotland's last council-run bus company.

Scotland's bus network, like that of Great Britain outside London, is deregulated following an act of UK Parliament in 1986. This broke up the former national and city bus companies, formerly run by the local authorities since the 1930s, into private companies. The act also allowed buses to be operated by private companies and individuals for profit, provided they met the financial, background and maintenance requirements to qualify for a licence, set down by Vehicle & Operator Services Agency who administrate the system. A Public Service Vehicle Licence is then granted to allow a specified number of vehicles to be operated. Using this licence firms can then register their routes with the Local Traffic Commissioner for the area, in this case Scotland, indicating the exact route to be operated as well as the times and dates their buses will run. No requirements are set as to when and what routes buses can run, their age and what fares can be charged-this is decided by companies, often by the profitability of the route. Currently only one bus company, Lothian Buses in Edinburgh, remains under ownership and control of local councils in Lothian and Edinburgh.

On 31 January 2022, free bus travel was introduced across Scotland for everyone aged under 22.

Water

Ferries 

As Scotland is made up of several hundred islands, water has always been an important transport route for passengers and freight, particularly in the remote communities of the Hebrides.

There are several ferry companies operating in Scotland including:
 Caledonian MacBrayne, a publicly owned ferry company with routes linking the mainland to all the major islands of the West Coast
 NorthLink Ferries, currently run by Serco, provides the lifeline and Scottish Government subsidised services to the Orkney Islands and Shetland Islands, linking them with Aberdeen and Scrabster
 Pentland Ferries, car and passenger ferries from Gills Bay (Scottish Mainland) to St. Margaret's Hope (Orkney).
 Stena Line link Cairnryan to the Belfast in Northern Ireland
 P&O provide a link to Larne in Northern Ireland from Cairnryan
 DFDS operate the Rosyth - Zeebrugge ferry service (freight only since 2010), formerly operated by Superfast Ferries and Norfolkline
 Western Ferries based in Hunters Quay, Argyll, operates on the Firth of Clyde, providing a frequent vehicle link between Hunters Quay, Cowal and McInroy's Point, Gourock, Inverclyde.
 SIC Ferries, owned by the Shetland Islands Council provide inter-island services in Shetland
 Orkney Islands Council own Orkney Ferries, which provides inter-island services in Orkney

The Strathclyde Partnership for Transport, formerly Strathclyde Passenger Transport, the only regional passenger executive in Scotland also subsidises and operates ferries on the Clyde including the Kilcreggan Ferry and the Renfrew Ferry.

The ferry to Gothenburg, Sweden, from "Newcastle" (actually North Shields) in northern England (currently run by the Danish company DFDS Seaways), ceased at the end of October 2006. This service was a key route for Scottish tourist traffic from Sweden and Norway. The company cited high fuel prices and new competition from low-cost air services, especially Ryanair (which now flies to Glasgow Prestwick and London Stansted from Gothenburg City Airport), as being the cause. DFDS Seaways' sister company, DFDS Tor Line, will continue to run scheduled freight ships between Gothenburg and several English ports, including Newcastle, and these have limited capacity for passengers, but not private vehicles. The Newcastle-Kristiansand, Norway, route has however recently been cancelled.

Waterways 

Scotland never had an extensive canal network. The Forth and Clyde Canal, Union Canal and the Caledonian Canal were some of the most important, but went into decline after the growth of the railways. They are now being reopened and restored primarily for leisure use.

Air transport 
Scotland has five international airports with scheduled services, operating to Europe, North America and Asia, as well domestic services to England, Northern Ireland and Wales.

 Aberdeen Airport
 Edinburgh Airport
 Glasgow Airport
 Glasgow Prestwick Airport
 Inverness Airport

Highlands and Islands Airports operates eleven airports across the Highlands, Orkney, Shetland and the Western Isles, which are primarily used for short distance, public service operations, although Inverness Airport has a number of scheduled flights to destinations across the UK and mainland Europe.

British Airways, EasyJet, Jet2 and Ryanair operate the majority of flights between Scotland and other major UK and European airports.

There are currently four Scottish-based airlines:

 Directflight
 Hebridean Air Services
 Loch Lomond Seaplanes
 Loganair

See also 
 List of Tramways in Scotland
 NaPTAN
 Rail transport in Great Britain
 Scotch gauge
 Transport in Aberdeen 
 Transport in Edinburgh 
 Transport in Glasgow
 Transport in the United Kingdom
 Transport in England
 Transport in Wales
 Transport in Northern Ireland
 Transport in the Republic of Ireland
 Transport Scotland

References

Further reading

External links
 Transport Scotland Key facts
 Scotland Railways Scottish Rail site with timetables, maps and cross-network passes for foreign travellers in Scotland.
 Coach and Bus Routes leaving from Scotland
 Coach and Bus Routes going to Scotland